Sungai Ara is a residential neighbourhood within the city of George Town in the Malaysian state of Penang. It is located within the Southwest Penang Island District, adjacent to the town of Bayan Lepas. Sungai Ara also borders Relau to the north and Bayan Baru to the east.

Etymology 
Sungai Ara literally means fig river''' in Malay; it was named after an eponymous river which flows through the area.

 History 
Sungai Ara was formerly an agricultural area; to this day, the original village of Sungai Ara still stands at the intersection of Jalan Dato Ismail Hashim and Jalan Tengah. The development of Sungai Ara into a residential township only began in the late 20th century, following the creation of the adjacent Bayan Lepas Free Industrial Zone in the 1970s.

 Transportation 
Jalan Dato Ismail Hashim and Jalan Tengah are the main thoroughfares within the neighbourhood. The former road was once known as Jalan Sungai Ara; the road was then renamed after a well-known Malaysian Quran reciter.

Rapid Penang bus routes 301, 302, 306 and 308 include stops within Sungai Ara, connecting the neighbourhood with various destinations, including Penang's capital city of George Town, the Penang International Airport, Bayan Lepas, Bayan Baru, Queensbay Mall, SPICE Arena and Teluk Kumbar.http://www.rapidpg.com.my/journey-planner/route-maps/details/302.gif http://www.rapidpg.com.my/journey-planner/route-maps/details/308.gif 

Sports
The football team of the area is Sungai Ara FC

 Education 
Sungai Ara is served by four primary schools and a single high school.Primary schools SRK Mutiara Perdana
 SRK Sungai Ara
 SRJK (C) Chong Cheng
 SRJK (T) Sungai AraHigh school'''
 SMK Sungai Ara

See also 

 Bayan Lepas

References 

Neighbourhoods in George Town, Penang
Southwest Penang Island District